Miandeh-ye Pain (also Romanized as Mīāndeh-ye Pā’īn) is a village in Asalem Rural District, Asalem District, Talesh County, Gilan Province, Iran. At the 2006 census, its population was 134, in 28 families.

References 

Populated places in Talesh County